Chundui is a township in Lhünzhub County, Tibet Autonomous Region, People's Republic of China, about  north of the urban area of Lhasa. It comprises three villages: Chunduicun (春堆村), Kadongcun (卡东村), and Luobaduicun (洛巴堆村).

References

External links

Populated places in Lhasa (prefecture-level city)
Township-level divisions of Tibet
Lhünzhub County